The following is an alphabetized and categorized list of notable tests.

Clinical psychology tests

Cognitive development tests

Intelligence tests 
 Cattell Culture Fair
 Kohs block
 Woodcock–Johnson Tests of Cognitive Abilities
 Multidimensional Aptitude Battery II
 Leiter International Performance Scale
 Miller Analogies Test
 Otis–Lennon School Ability Test
 Raven's Progressive Matrices
 Stanford–Binet Intelligence Scales
 Sternberg Triarchic Abilities Test
 Turing test
 Wechsler Adult Intelligence Scale
 Wechsler Intelligence Scale for Children
 Wechsler Preschool and Primary Scale of Intelligence
 Wonderlic Test

Medical tests

Self tests

Statistical tests 
 Ames test
 Chi-squared test
 Draize test
 Dixon's Q test
 F-test
 Fisher's exact test
 GRIM test
 Kolmogorov–Smirnov test
 Kuiper's test
 Likelihood-ratio test
 Median test
 Mann–Whitney U test
 Pearson's chi-squared test
 Rank product test 
 Shapiro–Wilk test
 Statistical hypothesis testing
 Student's t-test
 Tukey's range test
 Tukey's test of additivity
 Welch's t test

Personality tests

Pure-mathematical tests

Skills assessment tests 
 Student assessment test
 Scantron test
 Bourdon–Wiersma test
 Graduate Management Admission Test
 Graduate Record Examination (GRE)
 GRE Physics Test
 HESI exam
 Japanese-Language Proficiency Test
 Medical College Admission Test
 SAT college entrance test
 Screen test

Language tests 
 PTE-A (Pearson Test of English – Academic)
 VET (Versant English Test)
 IELTS (International English Language Testing System)
 iTEP (International Test of English Proficiency)
 TEFL (Teaching English as a Foreign Language)
 TOEFL (Test of English as a Foreign Language)
 TOEIC (Test of English for International Communication)
 TSE (Test of Spoken English)
 DALF (Test of French Language)

Industrial and manufacturing tests

Laboratory (non-medical) tests

Legal tests

Miscellaneous and uncategorized tests

See also 
 List of standardized tests in the United States

References 

List
Tests